Srutavarman was the first king of Chenla.

Biography 
King Srutavarman freed Kambuja “Chenla” from the domination of Funan in the 5th century. He descended from the House of Kambuj founded by Bramin, Kambu Svayambhuva and Apsara, Mera. He was the father of King Shreshthavarman.

References

Cambodian monarchs
6th-century Cambodian monarchs